Mugammad Salieg Nackerdien (born 19 July 1963) is a South African cricketer from Paarl. He was a left-handed batsman, and bowled Right Arm Medium. He represented Boland in First-class and List-A cricket He made his First-class debut in 1983/84 and almost three years later he played List-A also for Boland.

He retired from all forms of cricket in 1996.

References

External links 
 

1963 births
South African Muslims
South African cricketers
Living people
Boland cricketers
People from Paarl